James Latham Underhill (June 12, 1891 – October 7, 1991) was an officer of the United States Marine Corps with the rank of lieutenant general, who served as Assistant Division Commander of 4th Marine Division and later as Inspector of the Fleet Marine Force, Pacific during World War II.

Early career

James L. Underhill was born on June 12, 1891, in San Francisco. After the attending of local schools, he attended the University of California and graduated with Bachelor of Science degree in 1913. Underhill was commissioned second lieutenant in the Marine Corps on August 20, 1913, and his first assignment was with Marine Officers' School at Marine Barracks Norfolk, Virginia.

World War II

Colonel Underhill was transferred to the Headquarters Marine Corps in Washington, D.C., where he was appointed executive officer of the Adjutant and Inspector's Department in July 1939. He served in this capacity until March 1942, when he was appointed commander of the Marine Corps Base San Diego, California. Underhill was also promoted to the rank of brigadier general on 28 March 1942.

One year later, Brigadier General Underhill was transferred to the Command of Marine Corps Base Camp Lejeune, North Carolina. When 4th Marine Division was activated in August 1943, Underhill was appointed division assistant commander. He subsequently supervised the training together with the division commander, Major General Harry Schmidt, before it was shipped out to the Pacific in January 1944.

Underhill commanded Preliminary Landing Group during the landing at Kwajalein Atoll. He landed with 25th Marine Regiment and coordinated the landings with artillery support. Underhill was succeeded in his capacity of assistant division commander by Samuel C. Cumming on 11 April 1944. He was promoted to the rank of major general in May 1944 and also decorated with the Legion of Merit for his efforts during the Kwajalein operation.

Major General Underhill was subsequently appointed Tinian Island Commander and was responsible for the Island's defense. He served in this capacity until November 1944, when he was appointed deputy commander of Fleet Marine Force, Pacific. He served in this capacity until March 1945, when he was appointed inspector of Fleet Marine Force, Pacific.

Postwar career

Underhill returned to the United States and was appointed president of the Postwar Personnel Reorganization Board at Headquarters Marine Corps, Washington, D.C. in 1946. This office was tasked with study of the records of all officers, who wanted to stay in the active service. Underhill was responsible for recommendations, who would stay in active service and who would not. He finally retired from the Marine Corps on November 1, 1946. Underhill was also advanced to the rank of lieutenant general for having been specially commended in combat.

After his retirement from the military, he resided in Carmel, California, and cooperated with the Defense Language Institute. Underhill died on October 7, 1991, at the age of 100 in Monterey, California.

Decorations

References

1891 births
1991 deaths
People from San Francisco
American centenarians
Men centenarians
University of California alumni
United States Marine Corps personnel of World War I
United States Marine Corps World War II generals
American military personnel of the Banana Wars
United States Marine Corps generals
Recipients of the Legion of Merit
People from Carmel-by-the-Sea, California
Military personnel from California